Nabis plicatulus is a species of damsel bug in the family Nabidae. It was discovered on the Marquesas.

References

Nabidae
Insects described in 1932